Aldo Firicano (born 12 May 1967) is a former Italian football manager, currently working for Sangiovannese, and former footballer, who played as a defender.

Playing career
After early years in the minor leagues, Firicano joined Cagliari in 1989, with whom he won promotion to Serie A under Claudio Ranieri and made his top flight debut in 1990. In 1993 he also played in the UEFA Cup with them.

In 1996 he re-joined Ranieri at Fiorentina. He retired from professional football in 2004.

Coaching career
In 2004, Firicano took over his first coaching role as head coach of Sestese. He successively had a long career in the minor professional and amateur leagues of Italy with different teams.

In 2017 he served as head coach of Carrarese. After four years of inactivity, he was named new head coach of Serie D club Prato in February 2021. He left the club by the end of the 2020–21 season, and was successively appointed in charge of Sangiovannese, another Tuscan Serie D club, on 8 March 2022.

Honours
Fiorentina
Supercoppa Italiana: 1996

References

External links
 

Italian footballers
Serie A players
Serie B players
Serie C players
Serie D players
Trapani Calcio players
S.S. Arezzo players
ACF Fiorentina players
Udinese Calcio players
A.S.G. Nocerina players
Cagliari Calcio players
U.S. Salernitana 1919 players
Association football defenders
People from Trapani
1967 births
Living people
Footballers from Sicily
A.S.D. La Biellese managers
Sportspeople from the Province of Trapani